Karanth may refer to:

K. Shivaram Karanth, a major Kannada writer, social reformer, environmentalist, Yakshagana artist, movie maker and thinker
B. V. Karanth, a famous theatre personality from Karnataka, India
BV Karanth:Baba, a 2012 Indian film about him
Prema Karanth, a well-known theatre personality and the first-ever woman filmmaker of Kannada cinema
K. Ullas Karanth, a conservation zoologist and a leading tiger expert based in Karnataka, India